Volunteered Slavery is an album by jazz multi-instrumentalist Roland Kirk containing portions of his 1968  Newport Jazz Festival performance along with studio recordings  from July 1969. It was released on the Atlantic label and features performances by Kirk with Rahn Burton, Vernon Martin, Jimmy Hopps and Joseph "Habao" Texidor, Dick Griffin, Charles McGhee, Sonny Brown, Charles Crosby and the "Roland Kirk Spirit Choir".

Critical reception
The AllMusic review by Thom Jurek states: "Volunteered Slavery, with its beat/African chanted poetry and post-bop blues ethos was certainly the first strike in the right direction... Kirk proves that he is indeed the master of any music he plays because his sense of harmony, rhythm, and melody comes not only from the masters acknowledged, but also from the collective heart of the people the masters touched. It's just awesome".

Track listing
All compositions by Roland Kirk except as indicated.
 "Volunteered Slavery" - 5:43  
 "Spirits Up Above" - 3:37  
 "My Cherie Amour"  (Henry Cosby, Sylvia Moy, Stevie Wonder) - 3:20  
 "Search for the Reason Why" - 2:07  
 "I Say a Little Prayer" (Burt Bacharach, Hal David) - 7:59  
 "Roland's Opening Remarks" - 0:41  
 "One Ton" - 5:02  
 "Ovation and Roland's Remarks" - 1:42  
 "A Tribute to John Coltrane: Lush Life/Afro-Blue/Bessie's Blues" (Billy Strayhorn/Mongo Santamaría/John Coltrane) - 8:14  
 "Three for the Festival" - 4:23  
Recorded at the Newport Jazz Festival, Newport, Rhode Island, July 7, 1968 (tracks 6-10) and Regent Sound Studios, NYC, July 22 (tracks 2 & 4) and 23 (tracks 1, 3, & 5), 1969

Personnel
Roland Kirk: tenor saxophone, manzello, stritch, clarinet, flute, nose flute, whistle, voice, Stylophone
Charles McGhee: trumpet (tracks 1 & 5) 
Dick Griffin: trombone (tracks 1 & 5) 
Ron Burton: piano
Vernon Martin: bass
Charles Crosby: drums (track 1)
Sonny Brown: drums (tracks 2-5)
Jimmy Hopps: drums (tracks 6-10)
Joseph "Habao" Texidor: tambourine
The Roland Kirk Spirit Choir (tracks 1-5)

References

 Volunteered Slavery Liner Notes

1969 albums
Atlantic Records albums
Rahsaan Roland Kirk albums
Albums produced by Joel Dorn